Assistant Secretary of State (A/S) is a title used for many executive positions in the United States Department of State, ranking below the under secretaries. A set of six assistant secretaries reporting to the under secretary for political affairs manage diplomatic missions within their designated geographic regions, plus one assistant secretary dealing with international organizations. Assistant secretaries usually manage individual bureaus of the Department of State. When the manager of a bureau or another agency holds a title other than assistant secretary, such as "director," it can be said to be of "assistant secretary equivalent rank." Assistant secretaries typically have a set of deputies, referred to as deputy assistant secretaries (DAS).

History
From 1853 until 1913, the assistant secretary of state was the second-ranking official within the U.S. Department of State. Prior to 1853, the chief clerk was the second-ranking officer, and after 1913, the counselor was the second-ranking position, though the assistant secretary continued to be a position until 1924. From 1867, the Assistant Secretary of State was assisted by a second assistant secretary of state, and from 1875, by a third assistant secretary of state.  Specific duties of the incumbents varied over the years and included such responsibilities as supervising the Diplomatic and Consular Bureaus, general supervision of correspondence, consular appointments, administration of the Department, and supervision of economic matters and various geographic divisions.

Overview
Today, the title of the second-ranking position is the Deputy Secretary of State, with the next tier of State Department officials bearing the rank of Under Secretary of State.

The following is a list of current offices bearing the title of "Assistant Secretary of State":

Reporting directly to the United States secretary of state:
 Assistant Secretary of State for Intelligence and Research
 Assistant Secretary of State for Legislative Affairs
Reporting to the under secretary of state for political affairs:
 Assistant Secretary of State for African Affairs
 Assistant Secretary of State for East Asian and Pacific Affairs
 Assistant Secretary of State for European and Eurasian Affairs
 Assistant Secretary of State for International Organization Affairs
 Assistant Secretary of State for Near Eastern Affairs
 Assistant Secretary of State for South and Central Asian Affairs
 Assistant Secretary of State for Western Hemisphere Affairs
 Reporting to the under secretary of state for management:
 Assistant Secretary of State for Administration
 Assistant Secretary of State for Consular Affairs
 Assistant Secretary of State for Diplomatic Security
 Reporting to the under secretary of state for economic growth, energy, and the environment:
 Assistant Secretary of State for Economic and Business Affairs
 Assistant Secretary of State for Oceans and International Environmental and Scientific Affairs
 Assistant Secretary of State for Energy Resources
Reporting to the under secretary of state for public diplomacy and public affairs:
 Assistant Secretary of State for Educational and Cultural Affairs
 Assistant Secretary of State for Global Public Affairs
 Reporting to the under secretary of state for arms control and international security:
 Assistant Secretary of State for International Security and Nonproliferation
 Assistant Secretary of State for Political-Military Affairs
 Assistant Secretary of State for Arms Control, Verification, and Compliance
 Reporting to the under secretary of state for civilian security, democracy, and human rights:
 Assistant Secretary of State for Conflict and Stabilization Operations
 Assistant Secretary of State for Democracy, Human Rights, and Labor
 Assistant Secretary of State for International Narcotics and Law Enforcement Affairs
 Assistant Secretary of State for Population, Refugees, and Migration

The following roles also possess a rank equivalent to Assistant Secretary:
Chief of Protocol of the United States, with the rank of Ambassador
Coordinator for Counterterrorism, with the rank and status of Ambassador-at-Large
Special Assistant to the Secretary and Executive Secretary of the Department
Inspector General of the Department of State
Legal Adviser of the Department of State
Director General of the Foreign Service and Director of Global Talent
Director of Policy Planning
United States Ambassador-at-Large for Global Women's Issues
United States Ambassador-at-Large for Global Criminal Justice
United States Ambassador-at-Large to Monitor and Combat Trafficking in Persons
Coordinator of U.S. Government Activities to Combat HIV/AIDS Globally, with the rank of Ambassador-at-Large and U.S. Special Representative for Global Health Diplomacy
Director of the Foreign Service Institute
Science and Technology Adviser to the Secretary of State
Chief Information Officer of the Department
Director of the Office of Foreign Missions, with rank of Ambassador
Director of Budget and Planning
Comptroller of the Department
Chief Economist of the Department
Director of the Office of U.S. Foreign Assistance Resources
Chief Medical Officer and Designated Agency Safety and Health Official
Director of the Office of Civil Rights

Current assistant secretaries of state

List of Assistant Secretaries of State, 1853–1937

Second Assistant Secretary of State

The Consular and Diplomatic Appropriations Act for the year ending June 30, 1867 authorized the president to appoint a second assistant secretary of state. Duties of incumbents varied less over the years than did those of the other assistant secretary positions. Responsibilities included: supervision of correspondence with diplomatic officers; preparation of drafts of treaties, conventions, diplomatic notes, and instructions; detailed treatment of current diplomatic and political questions; approval of correspondence for the signature of the secretary or acting secretary; and consultation on matters of diplomatic procedure, international law and policy, and traditional practices of the Department. The Foreign Service Act of 1924 abolished numerical titles for assistant secretaries of state. Only two people held the position from 1866 to 1924.

Third Assistant Secretary of State

A federal appropriations act for the year ending Jun 30, 1875 (Jun 20, 1874; 18 Stat. 90), authorized the president to appoint a third assistant secretary of state. The secretary of state was authorized to prescribe the duties of the assistant secretaries and other Department of State employees, "and may make changes and transfers therein when, in his judgment, it becomes necessary." The third assistant secretary's duties varied over the years, including such diverse assignments as: supervision of several geographic divisions; oversight of the bureaus of accounts and appointments; international conferences and commissions; and ceremonials and protocol, including presentation to the president of chiefs of foreign diplomatic missions. The Foreign Service Act of 1924 (May 24, 1924; 43 Stat 146) abolished numerical titles for assistant secretaries of state.

Defunct offices including the designation of Assistant Secretary of State

Assistant Secretary of State for Occupied Areas

See also
 :Category:United States Assistant Secretaries of State, which includes some holders of post-1924 positions named Assistant Secretary of State

References

External links
The Department of State's organization page.
The Department of State's list of current or former positions and titles.
The Department of State's list of Assistant Secretaries of State during the time it was the second-ranking position.
The Department of State's list of Second Assistant Secretaries of State during the time it was the third-ranking position.
 Assistant Secretaries of State

 
United States Department of State
1867 establishments in the United States
1924 disestablishments
United States diplomacy